Nathaniel Wright (born December 21, 1947) is a former American football cornerback who played in the NFL from 1969–1980.

High school career
He attended Monterey High School in Monterey, California where he was a standout football and basketball player.

College career
He was an All-Conference player from two years at San Diego State University after transferring from Monterey Peninsula College before turning pro.

Professional career
Wright was drafted by the Atlanta Falcons in 1969. He played three games and recorded one fumble before being traded to the St. Louis Cardinals. In ten games, he recorded two interceptions. The next year saw him record just one interception before he moved over to the Minnesota Vikings in 1971. That year, he played in three games and recorded no interceptions. He recorded ten combined interceptions in the next three seasons, which included six in 1974. In the 1973 playoffs, he recorded an interception in the Divisional Round matchup against Washington off Billy Kilmer on their way to a victory (coincidentally, Wright's next interception in the playoffs was also against Kilmer). Wright didn't record a further interception as the Vikings lost in Super Bowl VIII. In the 1974 postseason, Wright recovered a fumble at the 20-yard line and ran it in for a touchdown that the Vikings won 30-14 over St. Louis. It was his first ever touchdown and only the first of two he ever scored in his career. 

Wright was the defensive player who was covering Drew Pearson during the 1975 NFC Playoffs on the infamous Hail Mary pass in the 1975 NFC Divisional Playoff Game between the Dallas Cowboys and Minnesota Vikings, played on December 28, 1975.  Some observers and Viking players believed that Pearson pushed off on  Wright, causing him to fall down and thus allowing Pearson to catch the pass from Roger Staubach and score the winning touchdown. However no penalty was called on Pearson.

He had his highest total in 1976 with seven. He recorded twelve combined interceptions over the next three years; Wright recorded his third and final interception in the playoffs in the 1978 NFC Championship, doing so off Roger Staubach in the 23-6 loss to the Dallas Cowboys. Wright's career eneded in 1980, and he did so after picking off two passes in sixteen games (four starts). He totaled 34 interceptions and three fumble recoveries in 156 professional games. He was never selected to a Pro-Bowl or given All-Pro honors.

See also
The Hail Mary (American football game)

References

1947 births
Living people
People from Madison, Florida
Sportspeople from Monterey, California
American football cornerbacks
San Diego State Aztecs football players
Atlanta Falcons players
Arizona Cardinals players
Minnesota Vikings players
Monterey Peninsula Lobos football players
Players of American football from California